Henrik Anckarsäter (12 October 1966 - 9 March 2021) was born in Gothenburg, Sweden, as Pär Henrik Georg Söderström, was Professor of Forensic Psychiatry and co-founder of the Centre for Ethics, Law and Mental Health  at the University of Gothenburg, and a consulting psychiatrist at the Sahlgrenska University Hospital. He has been guest professor at the Université Paris XII, France, and Lund University, Sweden, and board director of the International Academy of Law and Mental Health and on the board of the Society for Evidence-Based Gender Medicine. His research focus included child neuropsychiatry, including autism spectrum conditions, and the development of personality and identity in young adult years. He published nearly 200 papers in international peer-reviewed journals.

References

2021 deaths
1966 births
Scientists from Gothenburg
Autism researchers
Bipolar disorder researchers
Swedish medical researchers
Swedish psychiatrists
Academic staff of the University of Gothenburg